The 1930–31 international cricket season was from September 1930 to April 1931.

Season overview

December

Vizianagram's XI in Ceylon

West Indies in Australia

England in South Africa

References

International cricket competitions by season
1930 in cricket
1931 in cricket